Belidaphne hypoglypta is an extinct species of sea snail, a marine gastropod mollusk in the family Mangeliidae.

Description

Distribution
This extinct marine species was found in France.

References

 Fontannes (F.), 1880 Les Invertébrés du bassin tertiaire du Sud-Est de la France. Les Mollusques pliocènes de la vallée du Rhone et du Roussillon. Tome 1er: Gastéropodes des formations marines et saumatres. livraison 3, p. 169-258

External links
  Della Bella G., Naldi F. & Scarponi D. (2015). Molluschi marini del Plio-Pleistocene dell'Emilia-Romagna e della Toscana - Superfamiglia Conoidea, vol. 4, Mangeliidae II. Lavori della Società Italiana di Malacologia. 26: 1-80

hypoglypta
Gastropods described in 1880